Ex on the Beach Sweden (Ex on the Beach Sverige) started airing on Kanal 11 on 6 April 2015 and is the Swedish version of the British show Ex on the Beach. Season two started airing on Kanal 5 on 28 March 2016.

References

Mass media in Sweden
Ex on the Beach